The Ma On Shan Country Trail is a hiking trail in Ma On Shan Country Park, Hong Kong, running from Ma On Shan Village to Tai Shui Tseng via Ngong Ping.

See also
 List of hiking trails in Hong Kong

References

External links

 

Hiking trails in Hong Kong
Ma On Shan